Yenidoğan (also known as Bekirhan Yenidoğan) is a village in the Kozluk District, Batman Province, Turkey. The village is populated by Kurds of the Reşkotan tribe and had a population of 42 in 2021.

References

Villages in Kozluk District

Kurdish settlements in Batman Province